The 2008 congressional elections in New Jersey were held on November 4, 2008 to determine who would represent the state of New Jersey in the United States House of Representatives. New Jersey has thirteen seats in the House, apportioned according to the 2000 United States Census. Representatives are elected for two-year terms; those elected serve din the 111th Congress from January 4, 2009 until January 3, 2011.  The election coincided with the 2008 U.S. presidential election.

The statewide party primary elections were held June 3, 2008.

District 3 was the only seat which changed party (from open Republican to Democratic), although CQ Politics had forecasted districts 3, 5 and 7 to be at some risk for the incumbent party.

Overview

District 1

 
This district contains all or parts of Burlington, Camden and Gloucester counties.

Candidates 

 Rob Andrews (Democratic), incumbent U.S. Representative since 1990
 Dale Glading (Republican), founder of Saints Prison Ministry

Election 
Incumbent Democrat Rob Andrews, in a surprise move on April 2, 2008, announced that he would be challenging incumbent Sen. Frank Lautenberg in the Democratic primary in June. His House seat, which is reliably Democratic (CPVI: D+14), thus became an open seat. The filing deadline for primary candidates was April 7, leaving only a few days for candidates to declare.

Andrews' wife, Camille Andrews, won the Democratic primary for his seat in the House, while Andrews himself was beaten by Lautenberg in the Senate primary. After this defeat, Rob Andrews decided to run for re-election to his House seat; Camille withdrew her candidacy on September 3, and Rob Andrews announced that on September 4 that he would take her place as the Democratic candidate. He maintained that his wife had not been merely a placeholder candidate and said that he had only decided to run for re-election a week before he announced it; according to Andrews, his change of heart was a result of personal reflection.

Results

District 2

 
This district lies in the southern part of the state, containing all or portions of Atlantic, Burlington, Camden, Cape May: Cumberland, Gloucester and Salem counties.

Candidates 

 Dave Kurkowski (Democratic), City Councilman from Cape May
 Frank LoBiondo (Republican), incumbent U.S. Representative since 1995

Results 

Campaign contributions from OpenSecrets

District 3

 
This district contains all or portions of Burlington, Camden and Ocean counties.

Candidates 

 John Adler (Democratic), New Jersey State Senator
 Chris Myers (Republican), Mayor of Medford

Election 
Incumbent Republican Jim Saxton announced that he would retire at the end of his term. A mid-September internal poll by McLaughlin & Associates showed Myers defeating Adler by a margin of 33% to 29%, with a plurality of voters - 37% - undecided. The poll attributed Myers' lead to a general dissatisfaction among voters towards Adler's negative ads and negative mailers from various political committees supporting the Democrat. It also indicated that Adler's low approval ratings were partially due to the perception that he is a "career politician" and the fact that he is an Ivy League-educated lawyer. Adler's association with unpopular Democratic Gov. Jon Corzine also hurt him, while Myers was helped from his endorsement by incumbent Rep. Jim Saxton, who held a 53 percent favorable rating.
However, later polls indicated that the race was too close to call.

Results 

Campaign contributions from OpenSecrets

District 4

 
This district lies in the central part of the state, including all or portions of Burlington County, Mercer, Monmouth and Ocean counties.

Candidates 

 Chris Smith (Republican), incumbent U.S. Representative (1981)
 Josh Zeitz (Democratic), author, teacher, and historian

Results 

Campaign contributions from OpenSecrets

District 5

 
This district contains most of the Northern New Jersey Skylands Region of Sussex and Warren counties and stretches along the New York border into Northern Passaic and Bergen Counties, including the townships of Paramus and Ridgewood.

Candidates 

 Scott Garrett (Republican), incumbent U.S. Representative since 2003
 Dennis Shulman (Democratic), psychologist, public speaker, and rabbi

Election 
Republican incumbent Scott Garrett had been elected by safe margins in the past but in 2006 he only won by 10 points against Paul Aronsohn, the smallest margin of his career. Garrett was the only incumbent in the state thought to possibly be at risk.

Results 

Campaign contributions from OpenSecrets

District 6

 
This district lies in the east-central part of the state, including all or portions of Middlesex, Monmouth, Somerset and Union counties.

Candidates 

 Robert McLeod (Republican), municipal judge
 Frank Pallone (Democratic), incumbent U.S. representative since 1988

Results 

Campaign contributions from OpenSecrets

District 7

The incumbent, Republican Representative Mike Ferguson, announced on November 19, 2007, that he would not seek re-election, citing family obligations.

Candidates 
 Dean Greco (Independent), Clinton Township schoolteacher 
 Michael P. Hsing (Independent), Bridgewater Township councilman
 Leonard Lance (Republican), State Senator and former Minority Leader
 Linda Stender (Democratic), New Jersey Assemblywoman and 2006 Democratic nominee for New Jersey's 7th Congressional district

Eliminated in Republican primary 

A.D. Amar, professor at Seton Hall University
Kate Whitman Annis, former ice hockey player and daughter of former Governor Christine Todd Whitman
Kelly Hatfield, former Summit County Council President
Leonard Lance (Republican), State Senator and former Minority Leader
Martin L. Marks, Mayor of Scotch Plains
Thomas Roughneen, former Assistant Prosecutor in both Union and Essex counties

Election 
The district was considered to lean Republican, but the 2008 election was expected to be highly competitive, considering the closeness of the previous election.

Lance and Stender debated each other twice during the campaign.  In September, they met in Scotch Plains for a debate hosted at the Jewish Community Campus of Central New Jersey. The candidates met in October in Edison for a second debate, which was televised on News 12 New Jersey.

Both major-party candidates campaigned with prominent politicians of their party in the months before the election. Lance campaigned with then U.S. President George W. Bush and former Massachusetts Governor Mitt Romney. Stender campaigned with former U.S. president Bill Clinton and U.S. House of Representatives majority leader Steny Hoyer.

District 8

 
This district lies in the north-east part of the state, including all or portions of Essex and Passaic counties.

Candidates 

 Roland Straten (Republican), engineer and U.S. Navy veteran
 Bill Pascrell Jr. (Democratic), incumbent U.S. Representative since 1997

Results 

Campaign contributions from OpenSecrets

District 9

 
This district lies in the north-east part of the state, including all or portions of Bergen and Hudson and Passaic counties.

Candidates 

 Vincent Micco (Republican), U.S. Army veteran
 Steve Rothman (Democratic), incumbent U.S. Representative since 1997

Results 

Campaign contributions from OpenSecrets

District 10

 
This district lies in the north-east part of the state, including all or portions of Essex, Hudson and Union counties. Republicans again failed to nominate a candidate to oppose Payne, but the Socialist Workers Party nominated Michael Taber, an editor.

Candidates 

 Donald M. Payne (Democratic), incumbent U.S. Representative since 1989

Results 

Campaign contributions from OpenSecrets

District 11

 
This district lies in the north-central part of the state, including all or portions of Essex,  Morris, Passaic, Somerset and Sussex counties.

Candidates 

 Rodney Frelinghuysen (Republican), incumbent U.S. Representative since 1995
 Tom Wyka (Democratic), information technology manager and 2006 Democratic nominee for New Jersey's 11th Congressional district

Results 

Campaign contributions from OpenSecrets

District 12

 
This district lies in the central part of the state, including all or portions of Hunterdon, Mercer, Middlesex, Monmouth and Somerset counties.

Candidates 

 Alan Bateman (Republican), deputy mayor of Holmdel Township
 Rush Holt Jr. (Democratic), incumbent U.S. representative since 1999

Results 

Campaign Contributions from OpenSecrets.org

District 13

 
This district lies in the north-east part of the state, including all or portions of Essex, Hudson, Middlesex and Union counties.

Candidates 

 Albio Sires (Democratic), incumbent U.S. Representative since 2006
 Joseph Turula, former Pompton Lakes councilman and lawyer

Results 

Campaign contributions from OpenSecrets

References

External links
Division of Elections from the New Jersey Secretary of State
U.S. Congress candidates for New Jersey at Project Vote Smart
New Jersey U.S. House Races from 2008 Race Tracker
Campaign contributions for New Jersey congressional races from OpenSecrets

2008
New Jersey
United States House of Representatives